Mesopristes is a genus of fish in the family Terapontidae, the grunters. They are found in fresh, brackish and marine waters near the coast in the Indo-Pacific region.

Species include:
Mesopristes argenteus (De Vis, 1884) - silver grunter
Mesopristes cancellatus (Cuvier, 1829) - tapiroid grunter
Mesopristes elongatus (Guichenot, 1866) - plain terapon
Mesopristes iravi (Yoshino, Yoshigou & Senou, 2002)
Mesopristes kneri (Bleeker, 1876) - orange-spotted therapon

References

 
Terapontidae
Taxonomy articles created by Polbot